This list of electoral wards in Newport includes council wards, which elect councillors to Newport City Council in south Wales. There are also community wards, which elect councillors to community councils.

Since 2022 Newport has been divided into 21 city wards. There are also 14 community councils in the city and county.

Current wards

City wards
The city is divided into 21 wards, since May 2022 electing 51 councillors. Most of these wards are coterminous with communities (parishes) of the same name. The following table lists city council wards, communities and associated geographical areas. Communities with a community council are indicated with a '*':

Community council wards
There are 14 community councils in Newport.

2022 city ward changes
Following a boundary review by the Local Democracy and Boundary Commission for Wales, the overall number of wards increased from 20 to 21, with an overall increase in the number of city councillors from 50 to 51. The changes were effective from the 2022 local elections.

Eleven wards remained unchanged. Of the remainder:

 The community of Bishton was transferred from the Llanwern ward and merged with the Langstone ward, which was renamed Bishton and Langstone.
 The Llanwern ward would lose the community of Bishton but gain the community of Nash from neighbouring Liswerry.
 The Liswerry ward would lose the area of Nash, though retain its four city councillors.
 The area of Afon Village was transferred from the Graig ward to Rogerstone West.
 The Rogerstone ward would be divided into three new wards - Rogerstone East, Rogerstone North and Rogerstone West. 
 The Mon Bank development was transferred from the Pillgwenlly ward to Stow Hill.
 The Tredegar Park ward would be merged with the Marshfield ward to become Tredegar Park and Marshfield.

County borough and city wards 1995–2022
The 20 wards in Newport elected 50 city councillors since the 2004 local elections.

See also
List of electoral wards in Wales

References

 
ward